Trampled by Turtles is an American bluegrass-influenced folk band from Duluth, Minnesota. They have released ten full albums, three of which reached No. 1 on the U.S. Billboard bluegrass chart. Their fifth release, Palomino, stayed in the chart's Top 10 for 52 straight weeks. Their latest album, Alpenglow, was released on October 28, 2022.

Band members
 Dave Simonett – guitar, lead vocals, harmonica (2003- Present)
 Tim Saxhaug – bass, backing vocals (2003- Present)
 Dave Carroll – banjo, backing vocals (2003- Present)
 Erik Berry – mandolin, backing vocals (2003- Present)
 Ryan Young – fiddle, backing vocals  (2007- Present)
 Eamonn McLain – cello, backing vocals (2014- Present)

Discography

Albums

EPs
Sigourney Fever, BanjoDad Records (December 6, 2019)
A Lifetime to Find, BanjoDad Records (September 30, 2022)

Singles
"Are You Behind the Shining Star?" (2014)
"It's So Hard to Hold On" (2022)

Music videos

Appearances 
The band has performed at many national festivals including Coachella, Bonnaroo, Stagecoach, Hardly Strictly Bluegrass, Bumbershoot, and Pickathon. In 2011, they performed at several large folk music festivals including the Telluride Bluegrass Festival, the Newport Folk Festival, Floydfest, Pilgrimage, and ROMP: Bluegrass Roots & Branches Festival. They played at San Francisco's Outside Lands Music and Arts Festival, the Sasquatch Festival, Bonnaroo, Lollapalooza, the Austin City Limits Music Festival, the Firefly Festival, Rock the Garden, the All Good Music Festival, and the Newport Folk Festival in 2012.

Trampled by Turtles made their national television debut April 24, 2012 on Late Show with David Letterman. They returned to the Late Show with David Letterman on July 16, 2014 to play songs off their Wild Animals album.

Features 
Their single, "Are You Behind The Shining Star?" was featured in The Troubadour's Road Top 25 Songs of 2014.

Their music has been featured in TV shows including Deadliest Catch and Squidbillies. 

Their song "Alone" was featured at the end of the 2013 movie The Way Way Back.

Their song "Codeine" was featured in the 2018 video game Far Cry 5.

Their song "Ghosts" was featured in the Showtime series "Ray Donovan" in January 2019.

Honors and awards

The band has been honored with a star on the outside mural of the Minneapolis nightclub First Avenue, recognizing performers that have played sold-out shows or have otherwise demonstrated a major contribution to the culture at the iconic venue. Receiving a star "might be the most prestigious public honor an artist can receive in Minneapolis," according to journalist Steve Marsh.

References

External links
 Official website
 Live Show Downloads (provided by the Internet Archive)
 2012 Live concert 42 minutes WFUV archive
 
 Int'l Bluegrass Music Museum
 Firefly Festival

American bluegrass music groups
Musical groups from Minnesota
Musical groups established in 2004